The BioLogos Foundation is a Christian advocacy group that supports the view that God created the world using evolution of different species as the mechanism. It was established by Francis Collins in 2007 after receiving letters and emails from people who had read his book, The Language of God. The primary audience was Christians in the beginning, but Collins as well as later leaders of the organization have sought to engage with scientific skeptics as well as general audiences invested in biological science.

BioLogos affirms evolutionary creation as a core commitment.

Presidents

The foundation has been led by the following presidents:

 Francis Collins (foundation 2007 – 16 August 2009; resigned to become 16th director of the National Institutes of Health)
 Darrel R. Falk (16 August 2009 – January 2013)
 Deborah Haarsma (January 2013 – present)

During the COVID-19 pandemic, BioLogos sponsored livestream events featuring the NIH director and BioLogos founder Francis Collins.

Responses
The BioLogos Foundation has drawn criticism from both creationists and antitheists. A Time article about the foundation reported different responses in 2009.

BioLogos has also received praise and positive responses. Supporters of The BioLogos Foundation include Washington Post columnist Kathleen Parker, who has argued that the foundation's goal of "helping fundamentalists evolve can only be good for civilization."

References

Bibliography
 The Language of God: A Scientist Presents Evidence for Belief, by Francis Collins

Christian organizations established in 2007
Non-profit organizations based in Washington, D.C.
Criticism of creationism
Christianity and science
Christianity and evolution